David Ginsburg may refer to:

David Ginsburg (chemist) (1920–1988), Israeli researcher in synthetic organic chemistry
David Ginsburg (lawyer) (1912–2010), American political advisor and lawyer
David Ginsburg (politician) (1921–1994), British MP

See also
David Ginzburg, mathematician